Terson syndrome or Terson's syndrome is the occurrence of a vitreous hemorrhage of the human eye in association with subarachnoid hemorrhage. Vitreous hemorrhage of the eye can also occur in association with intracranial hemorrhage and elevated intracranial pressure (ICP). Intraocular hemorrhage can be a subretinal, retinal, preretinal, subhyaloidal, or intra-vitreal hemorrhage. Its likely cause is a rapid increase in ICP. The classic presentation is in the subhyaloidal space, which is beneath the posterior vitreous face and in front of the retina.

In subarachnoid hemorrhage, 13% of patients have Terson's syndrome, which is associated with more severe SAH (higher Hunt-Hess score, a marker of severity), and risk of death is significantly increased.

The first known report of the association was by the German ophthalmologist Moritz Litten in 1881. Still, French ophthalmologist Albert Terson's name is more commonly associated with the condition after a report by his hand from 1900.

References

External links 

eMedicine topic

Eye diseases
Syndromes affecting the eye